Sashi Kiran is a Fijian politician, social entrepreneur and activist, who since December 2022 has served as the Assistant Minister of Woman, Children and Poverty Alleviation. She is a member of the National Federation Party. She is the founder and former director of a non-profit community organisation known as Foundation for Rural Integrated Enterprises and Development (FRIEND) in Fiji. In 2015 she was appointed a member of Fiji's Human Rights and Anti-Discrimination Commission.

Early life 
Kiran worked as a journalist for Fiji Commuications before joining the Fiji Council of Social Services. Following the 2000 Fijian coup d'état Kiran founded FRIEND in 2001 to create income generating opportunities for rural and semi-urban settlements and villages, with a particular focus on youth and people with special needs. Some of its projects include a line of chutneys made by women in rural communities with raw ingredients purchased from small-holder farmers, flours made from local crops, greeting cards made by people with disabilities and herbal teas. In 2017 the organisation opened a restaurant specialising in traditional Fijian and Indian food. The organisation also works on disaster response initiatives, rehabilitation and healing, and peace building projects.

Kiran has worked with the Commonwealth Foundation on a regional report on citizens and good governance and served on the executive council of international NGO CIVICUS as well as Asia South Pacific Association for Basic and Adult Education. In 2017 she served on the Commonwealth Elections Observer Team for the 2017 elections in Papua New Guinea.

Political career
In November 2022 Kiran resigned from FRIEND to stand in the 2022 Fijian general election as a candidate for the National Federation Party. Her decision resulted in her being attacked by Attorney-General Aiyaz Sayed-Khaiyum, who accused her of using FRIEND as a front for her political agenda. She won 2024 votes and was elected to the Parliament of Fiji. On 24 December 2022 she was appointed Assistant Minister for Women, Children and Poverty Alleviation in the coalition government of Sitiveni Rabuka.

References

Living people
Year of birth missing (living people)
Fijian activists
Social entrepreneurs
National Federation Party politicians
Members of the Parliament of Fiji
21st-century Fijian women politicians
21st-century Fijian politicians